Waqutuyuq (Quechua waqutu a variety of potatoes, -yuq a suffix, "the one with the waqutu", also spelled Huajotuyoc) is a mountain in the Andes of Peru which reaches a height of approximately . It is located in the Junín Region, Jauja Province, Pomacancha District.

References 

Mountains of Peru
Mountains of Junín Region